Doyle House may refer to:

Doyle House (Austin, Texas), formerly listed on the National Register of Historic Places in Travis County, Texas
Doyle House (Houston, Texas), listed on the National Register of Historic Places in Harris County, Texas

See also
David Doyle House No. 2, El Paso, Arkansas, listed on the National Register of Historic Places in White County, Arkansas 
Doyle-Benton House, Denver, Colorado, listed on the National Register of Historic Places in Northeast Denver, Colorado
Harold A. (H.A.) Doyle House, Yankton, South Dakota, listed on the National Register of Historic Places in Yankton County, South Dakota
John Doyle House, Park City, Utah, listed on the National Register of Historic Places in Summit County, Utah 
Doyle Settlement, Pueblo, Colorado, listed on the National Register of Historic Places in Pueblo County, Colorado
Doyle Place, Florence, Kansas, listed on the National Register of Historic Places in Marion County, Kansas
A. E. Doyle Cottage, Nehalem, Oregon